Cordalba is a rural town and locality in the Bundaberg Region, Queensland, Australia.

The town was founded in 1896 and played an important role in the sugar workers strike of 1911.

Geography

The Loggers Creek runs through the township which is situated next to the Cordalba State Forest. With rugged hills of open eucalypt woodland, this park is an adventurer's retreat. It protects several species such as possums and gliders which are nocturnal, and activities include many mountain biking and walking trails and birdwatching during the day.

Climate
Cordalba has a subtropical climate with wet, hot summers and mild winters.

Culture and community
Typical of a small rural township, entertainment in Cordalba is centered on local school events and social events at the Commercial Hotel. Cordalba State School is a co-educational school, located in township. The school has 85 students enrolled from Prep to Year Six, the Cordalba State School was established in 1894.

It is typical for families to spend time in the 'Cordalba State Forest' and go for bike rides along the Joey Traill. With rugged hills of open eucalypt woodland, this park is an adventurer's retreat. You can spotlight for possums and gliders at night and go mountain biking or birdwatching during the day.

History

The original inhabitants of the area were the Kabi (or Kabi Kabi) tribe of aboriginal people living a traditional lifestyle focused on native foods of the area, and fishing in nearby streams, rivers and the sea. Their legacy can be seen in the name "Cordalba" meaning "place of the koalas".

Isis River Provisional School opened in 1881. In 1893 it was renamed Abingdon Provisional School. On 22 January 1894 it was renamed Cordalba Provisional School. On 24 January 1901 it became Cordalba State School.

In the colonial period the great impetus for growth in local agriculture came with the arrival of the railway line in Cordalba in 1896 from the main Childers line. The township functioned as the main Queensland Railways depot and interchange station between 1896 and 1964, an old railway goods shed being a reminder of those days.

Cordalba Post Office opened on 25 November 1896 (a receiving office had been open from 1893) and closed in 1981.          :

St Saviour's Anglican Church was dedicated on 13 March 1898 by Bishop William Webber. It closed circa 1988.

The town used to be in the Shire of Isis.

The commercial Hotel is famous for its former proprietress Maude Sheehan. Much like the Young & Jackson's Hotel in Melbourne and its famous nude artwork "Chloe", the Commercial Hotel in Cordalba also has a nude painting hanging over the public bar. When fully clothed, the model, Maude Sheehan, once actually ran the place. Maude was amply built and famous for her fiery red hair, which matched an easily aroused temper. Legend has it that on one occasion Maude kicked off a troublemaker, who returned the following day, this time riding his horse into the bar. Incensed at the intrusion, Maude punched the horse between the eyes, bringing both horse and rider to the floor. Maude's nude portrait hangs alongside a rare early Marilyn Monroe poster which was retrieved from the town's rubbish dump.

In the 1970s, Cordalba had seven pubs, prior to a 'spate of bad luck' with fire.

Education
Cordalba State School is a government primary (Prep-6) school for boys and girls at Cemetery Road. In 2017, the school had an enrolment of 69 students with 5 teachers (4 full-time equivalent) and 8 non-teaching staff (4 full-time equivalent).

Attractions

 The Commercial Hotel
 The Cordalba State School
 Mango Tree Church, on Hodges Road
Cordalba State Forest
Cordalba General Store

See also
 List of tramways in Queensland

References

External links

 Town map of Cordalba, 1966

Towns in Queensland
Wide Bay–Burnett
1896 establishments in Australia
Populated places established in 1896
Bundaberg Region
Localities in Queensland